Canal+ Gol was a Polish station speciality on football.

Canal+ Gol HD
In 2011 starting channel Canal+ Gol HD. This channel is available in satellite Cyfra+ and cable platform UPC Poland.

See also
 Canal+ Sport (Poland)

Defunct television channels in Poland
Television channels and stations established in 2004
Television channels and stations disestablished in 2013
Canal+ Premium